Live Floor Show is a television comedy show produced by BBC Scotland for three series from 2002–2003. The first two series, hosted by Greg Hemphill, were broadcast on BBC One Scotland. The third series, hosted by Dara Ó Briain, was shown on BBC Two.

The programme featured a number of regular acts on one of the three stages at the Queen Margaret Drive studios in Glasgow: Frankie Boyle, Al Murray, Craig Hill, Paul Sneddon, Miles Jupp, and Jim Muir. The show also featured many other well-known guest acts: Bill Bailey, Doug Stanhope, Mackenzie Crook, Des McLean, Des Clarke, Craig Charles, Dan Antopolski, Jo Brand, and Matt Blaize.

At the end of each show there was a musical act. One notable appearance was by Robert Plant, on the same night as Bill Bailey.

References

2000s British comedy television series
2000s Scottish television series
2002 Scottish television series debuts
2003 Scottish television series endings
BBC Scotland television shows
BBC television comedy
Scottish television comedy